Maureen C. Stone is an American computer scientist, specializing in color modeling.

Biography
Stone has bachelor's and master's degrees from the University of Illinois at Urbana–Champaign and another master's degree from the California Institute of Technology. She worked for many years at Xerox PARC; after leaving PARC, she founded a consulting firm in the Seattle, Washington area in 1998, and is an adjunct professor in the School for Interactive Arts and Technology at Simon Fraser University in Vancouver, British Columbia, Canada.

Stone was program chair for SIGGRAPH in 1987, and
editor-in-chief of the journal IEEE Computer Graphics and Applications from 2007 to 2010.

Research
Stone began working in computer graphics in the early 1970s, as part of the PLATO project at the University of Illinois.  She is the author of the book A Field Guide to Digital Color, and has performed pioneering research on color management for digital printing. She has also collaborated with colleagues from PARC on research in human–computer interaction; some of her highly cited works in this area concern snapping to nearby objects in point and click interfaces, transparent user interface elements, and interaction with high-resolution video displays.

Recognition
In 2020, Stone was listed in the IEEE Visualization Academy by the IEEE Visualization and Graphics Technical Community.

Selected publications

Articles
.
.
.
.

Books
.

References

Year of birth missing (living people)
Living people
American computer scientists
American women computer scientists
Color scientists
Human–computer interaction researchers
University of Illinois Urbana-Champaign alumni
California Institute of Technology alumni
Academic staff of Simon Fraser University
Scientists at PARC (company)
American women academics